The 1923 Wyoming Cowboys football team was an American football team thatt represented the University of Wyoming as a member of the Rocky Mountain Conference (RMC) during the 1923 college football season. In their eighth and final season under head coach John Corbett, the Cowboys compiled a 0–8 record (0–7 against conference opponents), finishing in last place out of ten teams in the RMC. They were shut out in five of eight games and were outscored by a total of 265 to 16. C. E. Wittenbraker was the team captain.

Schedule

References

Wyoming
Wyoming Cowboys football seasons
Wyoming Cowboys football
College football winless seasons